is a 1964 Japanese film by the noted filmmaker Seijun Suzuki. It stars Akira Kobayashi and Hideki Takahashi as two brothers who seek revenge on the yakuza for the death of their father.

Cast
 Akira Kobayashi as Ryōta Asari
 Hideki Takahashi as Shinji Asari
 Kaku Takashina as Katagai
 Shōbun Inoue as Ushigoro Tobita
 Chieko Matsubara as Yasuko
 Eitaro Ozawa as Nambada

References

External links
 Japan Foundation notes at Cinefiles
 
 
 Our Blood Will Not Forgive  at the Japanese Movie Database

1964 films
1964 crime films
Films directed by Seijun Suzuki
1960s Japanese-language films
Nikkatsu films
Yakuza films
Films produced by Masayuki Takagi
1960s Japanese films